LMAX Group is a global financial technology company which operates multiple institutional execution venues for electronic foreign exchange (FX) and crypto currency trading. The Group's portfolio includes LMAX Exchange, LMAX Global  and LMAX Digital.

Headquartered in London, UK, LMAX Group builds and runs its own global exchange infrastructure, which includes matching engines in London, New York and Tokyo. The company has regional offices in New York, Chicago, Hong Kong, Singapore, Tokyo and Auckland.

History
LMAX Group was launched in 2010 to offer exchange-style execution and regulated, rules-based, no ‘last look’ trading environment which is governed by the LMAX Rulebook, ensuring fully transparent and fair execution for all its clients and market makers. Servicing funds, banks, brokerages, asset managers and proprietary trading firms, the company offers an anonymous, regulated and rules-based trading environment with strict price and time priority order execution at ultra-low latency. Clients have access to real-time streaming market and trade data, which enables the control of execution quality and total trading costs.

In 2014, LMAX Group was ranked the fastest growing company in the UK by the Sunday Times TechTrack 100. The company also open-sourced some components of its technology, including Disruptor concurrency software, to support the extremely low latency requirements of its trade processing servers.

The firm is an active contributor to the reformation of the FX industry and became the first market participant to commit to FX Global Code. LMAX Group has contributed to the industry’s understanding of execution factors and trading costs across different liquidity pools by publishing several research papers and a transaction cost analysis (TCA) white paper which resulted in the development of industry-leading FX TCA methodology and analytical tools. Central to the reports are survey findings, conducted to assess the market sentiment at a particular point in time and recommendations on the changes needed within the FX market in light of technology innovation, market sentiment and evolving international regulation.

In July 2021, private equity firm JC Flowers agreed to pay US$300 million to acquire a 30% stake in LMAX, bringing the valuation of the Group to $1 billion.

Portfolio
LMAX Exchange operates global institutional FX exchanges and A Financial Conduct Authority (FCA) regulated multilateral trading facility (MTF). The central limit order book (CLOB) execution model offers streaming firm liquidity from top tier banks and non-bank institutions, transparent price discovery, no ‘last look’ rejections and full control over trading strategy and costs.

LMAX Global is a regulated broker for FX, metals and commodities worldwide. Servicing retail brokers and professional traders, LMAX Global offers execution services and access to institutional firm liquidity and tight spreads from the LMAX Exchange CLOB.

LMAX Digital is a regulated institutional spot crypto currency exchange which was launched in May 2018. Based on proven and proprietary technology from LMAX Group, LMAX Digital allows global institutions to acquire, trade and hold the most liquid digital assets - BTC, ETH, LTC, BCH and XRP safely and securely. The company was granted with a license from the Gibraltar Financial Services Commission (GFSC) as a Distributed Ledger Technology (DLT) provider for execution and custody services in April 2019.

References

External links
 

Foreign exchange companies
Financial services companies established in 2010
British companies established in 2010